Amin Salam is a Lebanese Sunni international corporate lawyer, economist and the Minister of Economy in Najib Mikati's cabinet.

Biography 

He attended Sagesse University and George Washington University, earning a law degree.

Career 

In 2007, he served as an International Legal Counsel for Shearman & Sterling LLP based in New York City where he advised clients on structuring business transactions with sovereign wealth funds, conducted due diligence on legal disputes involving major oil and gas companies in the MENA region, and advised clients on major mergers and acquisitions.

In 2011, he served as Vice President of the National U.S.–Arab Chamber of Commerce where he functioned as the primary liaison between the US and the 22 MENA countries in advising high level officials in the public and private sectors on issues of trade, investment, security, and foreign affairs. In this capacity, he promoted sustainable bilateral business relationships for major corporations.

In 2018, he served as a senior managing director at Ankura Global Consulting Group where he advised on global infrastructure projects, trade, FDI and managed the global operations of the firm with focus on the EMEA regions.

References 

George Washington University alumni
Living people
All stub articles
1970 births
Economy and Trade ministers of Lebanon

Azm Movement politicians